Olleya namhaensis is a Gram-negative, rod-shaped and motile bacterium from the genus of Olleya.

References

Flavobacteria
Bacteria described in 2013